Major-General Isaac Pierre de Villiers  (20 August 189111 October 1967) was a South African military commander and police official.  Originally an attorney by profession, he served in the Royal Field Artillery during World War I, and was awarded the Military Cross. In 1928, he was appointed a lieutenant colonel in the South African Police, later succeeding to the post of Commissioner.

Early life
He was born in Somerset East, Cape Colony on 20 August 1891 to Jan S. de Villiers of Cape Town. He was educated at the South African College School in Cape Town and the University of Cape Town.

Military service
He was commissioned in the Royal Artillery during World War I, serving in German South-West Africa and the Western Front. He was awarded the Military Cross while serving in the 68th Brigade.

Back in South Africa in 1919, he joined his father's law firm but in 1928, was appointed Commissioner of Police for the Union of South Africa.

He volunteered for military service in World War II, and served as General Officer Commanding 2nd South African Infantry Division from 1940 to 1942.  He trained the division, which incorporated a police battalion, and commanded them in internal security operations at the beginning of the war, then commanded the division in North Africa in 1941 and 1942, for which he was made a Companion of the Bath (CB). During this campaign units under his command, including New Zealand cavalry, were responsible for the capture of Bardia, but many of the South African division's personnel were taken prisoner of war at Tobruk.

From 1942 to 1945, he commanded the Coastal Area Command, responsible for the coastal defence of South Africa. In this capacity he was called upon to co-operate with the Royal Navy, and made a name both by his determination to make a success of his command and by his scrupulous fairness in dealing with individuals.

In addition to the honours for his military service, he was appointed a Commander in the Venerable Order of Saint John in 1936, and a Knight in the same order in 1943.

Awards

Family life
He married Vivienne Marais in 1936. He retired in 1945, but was chairman of the Immigrants Selection Board from 1946 to 1948. He died in Pretoria on 11 October 1967.

References

See also 
 
 

 

 

 

1891 births
1967 deaths
Afrikaner people
South African people of French descent
Royal Artillery officers
British Army personnel of World War I
South African military personnel of World War II
Companions of the Order of the Bath
Recipients of the Military Cross
South African Army generals
South African military officers
South African police officers
Commanders of the Order of St John
Knights of the Order of St John
University of Cape Town alumni